Lord of the Harvest is a 1993 album by Bootsy Collins under the alias Zillatron (a.k.a. Fuzzface) and was produced by Collins and Bill Laswell.

Background 
Musically, the album leans toward funk metal, features extensive use of samples and is darker in tone than previous Bootsy Collins albums. The album also has a strong science fiction theme. The album was released as part of Bill Laswell's Black Arc Series. Lord of the Harvest is dedicated to the memory of Parliament-Funkadelic lead guitarist Eddie Hazel who died some months earlier in December 1992.

Release history 
The album was released by the Polystar label in Japan and by Rykodisc in the United States. A remastered version of Lord of the Harvest was reissued in 2003 by Laswell's Innerhythmic label. Some early copies of the album have the first two tracks combined as one.

Tracks

Personnel
Bootsy Collins - space bass, vocals
Bernie Worrell - keyboards, synthesizers
Buckethead - electric and acoustic guitars
Bill Laswell - ambient sounds and noises
Grandmaster Melle Mel - chant
Umar Bin Hassan - chant
Deborah Barsha, Kristen Gray, Momma Collins - vocals
Brenda Holloway, Patti Willis - backing vocals

References

External links
 (1993 Rykodisc release)
 (1993 Polystar release)
 (2003 Innerhythmic release)

Bootsy Collins albums
1993 albums
albums produced by Bill Laswell
Rykodisc albums